"Long Live Love" is a Chris Andrews composition which, in 1965, gained Sandie Shaw the second of her three UK number one hit singles.

In the UK
Although it was stated Shaw was sufficiently confident in the hit potential of the buoyant "Long Live Love" as to turn down the chance to record "It's Not Unusual", allowing the song to be given to Tom Jones and become his first hit, this was not true. Jones' demo version that Shaw and manager Eve Taylor heard was much slower than the hit version, and the "Bom, Bom Bom" rhythm of "Unusual" can clearly be heard in the rhythm of "Long Live Love". "Long Live Love" did spend three weeks at No. 1 in the UK in June 1965, also giving Shaw a No. 1 hit in both Ireland and New Zealand, with a No. 2 peak attained in South Africa. A top ten hit in both the Netherlands (No. 7) and Norway (No. 8), "Long Live Love" was also a hit in Australia (No. 12) and Belgium, reaching No. 15 on the latter territory's Dutch language chart.

According to writer Patricia Juliana Smith, "Long Live Love" was "arguably the last big calypso hit to top the British charts", as it was released when the genre was losing popularity in the UK.

International
The original English-language version of "Long Live Love" was a substantial hit in Canada, peaking at No. 6; and in Australia, where it hit No. 12.  In the US, "Long Live Love" received enough regional attention to return Shaw to the Billboard Hot 100 for the third and last time, peaking at No. 97 the week of June 26, 1965.  Billboard described the song as a "happy rhythm hand-clapper with good dance beat."

In France, Shaw reached No. 5 with lyricist Georges Liferman's rendering of "Long Live Love" entitled "Pourvu Que Ça Dure"; at the same time the original "Long Live Love" reached No. 32 on the French charts. Shaw also recorded "Long Live Love" for the market in Germany as "Du weißt nichts von deinem Glück"; both the German rendition and English original reached the German top 30, their respective peaks being No. 25 ("Du weißt nichts...") and No. 28 ("Long Live Love"). The German-language version charted higher in Austria (No. 3). In 1966, Shaw made a belated Italian rendering of "Long Live Love" entitled "Viva l’amore con te". However the track was relegated to the B-side of "E ti avrò", a recording of the even older "Girl Don't Come", which reached No. 11 on the Italian chart.

Also in 1966, Shaw rendered "Long Live Love" as "¡Viva el amor!" for an EP released in Spain which also featured renderings of Shaw's UK hits "Girl Don't Come", "Message Understood" and "Tomorrow".

Other versions
Besides Sandie Shaw's own non-English renderings of "Long Live Love", the song was recorded in 1965 as "Kiva, kiva rakkaus" by Marion Rung, "Leve kärleken"  by Lill-Babs and "Viva el amor" by Gelu.

In 1992, Nick Berry recorded "Long Live Love" to be the follow-up single to his hit version of the theme from the TV series Heartbeat; Berry's version of "Long Live Love", which was featured in the Heartbeat series, reached No. 47 on the UK Singles Chart.

"Long Live Love"  has also been recorded by its composer Chris Andrews, as well as Tracey Ullman and Jessica Andersson on her 2009 album, Wake Up.

There is no connection between the Chris Andrews composition and the Olivia Newton-John song of the same title which served as the 1974 Eurovision entry for the UK.

Shaw's original version was featured in Mike Figgis' 1999 film The Loss of Sexual Innocence.

Charts

References

1965 songs
1965 singles
1992 singles
Sandie Shaw songs
Nick Berry songs
UK Singles Chart number-one singles
Irish Singles Chart number-one singles
Number-one singles in New Zealand
Songs written by Chris Andrews (singer)
Pye Records singles
Calypso songs